The sand isopod, Chiridotea coeca, is a species of isopod crustacean found in the western Atlantic Ocean, from Nova Scotia to Florida.

Characteristics
Adult sand isopods are horizontally flattened. The thorax is almost round from above and the long, robust legs with large setae. The abdomen is short and pointed. They use the last pair of legs to dig tunnels in sand. When removed from the tunnels (for instance, by wave action), sand isopods swim down to the substrate, where they dig underground again.

Ecology
C. coeca feeds on carrion, which it holds with its gnathopods while chewing pieces off with its mandibles.

References

Further reading
 Grzimek's Animal Life Encyclopedia. Volume 2 – Protostomes.

Valvifera
Crustaceans of the Atlantic Ocean
Crustaceans described in 1818